Flamingo creek is the first residential community under construction in The Lagoons, Deyaar is the master developer of the project spreading over , upon completion it will have apartments and townhouses, shops, restaurants, health clubs, swimming pools as well as a school district.  The development is expected to be completed in 2011.
The project will be the first to be completed at The Lagoons, a development, including seven artificial islands, along the Dubai Creek.

See also
Dubai Creek Cultural Project

References

constructionweekonline.com
Arabianbusiness.com
Ameinfo.com
zawya.com
Estatesdubai.com

Proposed buildings and structures in Dubai